Captain Digby Dent (1682–1737) was a Royal Navy officer who served as Commander-in-Chief of the Jamaica Station.

Naval career
Dent was promoted to post captain in October 1715 on appointment to the command of the fifth-rate HMS Lynn. He transferred to the command of the fourth-rate HMS Mermaid in 1720, of the fifth-rate HMS Launceston in 1722 and of the third-rate HMS Lennox in 1726. He went on to take the command of the third-rate HMS Captain in 1731 and of the fourth-rate HMS Dunkirk in 1735.
 
Dent served briefly as Commander-in-Chief of the Jamaica Station, with his broad pennant in the second-rate HMS Shrewsbury, from 1736 until his death in 1737.

Family
His son Digby Dent (c1713-1761) was also a Royal Navy officer. and his Grandson (via son Royal Navy Capt.Cotton Dent 1715–1761), also Digby Dent (1739-1817), was a Royal Naval Officer who was knighted in 1778.

References

Sources

Royal Navy officers
1737 deaths
Place of birth missing
1682 births